Nothin' but the Taillights is the seventh studio album by American country music singer Clint Black. Black co-wrote many of the songs with others and played much of the guitar himself for this album.

"Something That We Do", "Nothin' but the Taillights", and "The Shoes You're Wearing" were hit singles. The latter two of those three songs reached #1. The album is currently certified platinum by the RIAA.

"Still Holding On" was co-written with Matraca Berg and Marty Stuart and performed as a duet with Martina McBride. This song was also included on McBride's Evolution album, also released in 1997.

"Ode To Chet" is an ode to guitar player Chet Atkins and features Steve Wariner, Larry Carlton, Dann Huff, Hayden Nicholas, Mark Knopfler, and Atkins and Black themselves on guitar.

Track listing

Personnel

Band 
Clint Black — acoustic guitar, harmonica, electric guitar, lead vocals, background vocals
Chet Atkins — electric guitar on "Ode To Chet"
Barry Bales — acoustic bass on "Our Kind of Love"
Eddie Bayers — drums
Ron Block – acoustic guitar on "Our Kind of Love"
Mike Brignardello — bass guitar
Robbie Buchanan — piano, keyboards
Larry Byrom — acoustic guitar
Larry Carlton — electric guitar on "Ode To Chet"
Stuart Duncan — fiddle, mandolin
Skip Ewing — acoustic guitar
Paul Franklin — steel guitar
Dann Huff — electric guitar on "Ode To Chet"
Mark Knopfler — electric guitar on "Ode To Chet"
Alison Krauss — fiddle, viola, and background vocals on "Our Kind of Love"
The London Session Orchestra — strings
Martina McBride — duet vocals on "Still Holding On"
Hayden Nicholas — electric guitar
Dean Parks — acoustic guitar
Steve Real — background vocals
Michael Rhodes — bass guitar
John Robinson — drums
Matt Rollings — piano
Leland Sklar — bass guitar
Adam Steffey — mandolin on "Our Kind of Love"
Fred Tackett — acoustic guitar
Dan Tyminski — acoustic guitar and background vocals on "Our Kind of Love"
Julianna Waller — fiddle
Steve Wariner — electric guitar on "Ode To Chet"

Production 

Clint Black — producer
James Stroud — producer
Kevin Beamish — engineer
Ricky Cobble — assistant engineer, mixing assistant
Mark Hagen — assistant engineer
Richard Hanson — assistant engineer
Ronn Huff — arranger, conductor
Julian King — engineer, mixing
Pete Martinez — assistant engineer
Glenn Meadows — mastering
Patrick Murphy — assistant engineer
John Nelson — assistant engineer
Gary Paczosa — engineer
Ray Rogers — assistant engineer
Craig White — mixing assistant

Charts

Weekly charts

Year-end charts

Singles

References

Nothin' but the Taillights [CD liner notes]. 1997. RCA Records.
[ Nothin' but the Taillights Credits]. Allmusic. Retrieved on January 5, 2007.
[ Artist Chart History (Singles)]. Billboard. Retrieved on January 1, 2007.
[ Artist Chart History (Albums)]. Billboard. Retrieved on January 1, 2007.

1997 albums
Clint Black albums
RCA Records albums
Albums produced by James Stroud
Albums produced by Clint Black